Lobi (also Miwa and Lobiri) is a Gur language of Burkina Faso, Ivory Coast and Ghana.

References

Gur languages
Languages of Burkina Faso
Languages of Ghana
Languages of Ivory Coast